Comedy Bang! Bang! (formerly Comedy Death-Ray Radio) is a weekly comedy audio podcast, which originally began airing as a radio show on May 1, 2009. Popularly known as Humanity's Podcast, it is hosted by writer and comedian Scott Aukerman, best known for his work on the 1990s HBO sketch comedy program Mr. Show with Bob and David, creating and hosting the Comedy Bang! Bang! TV series, and co-founding the weekly Comedy Death-Ray stage show at the Upright Citizens Brigade Theatre in Hollywood.

Comedy Death-Ray Radio was formerly broadcast from Southern California's Indie 103 studios, but since the summer of 2010 has been broadcast as part of the Earwolf comedy podcasting network, being recorded in studios owned by the company.

Comedy Bang! Bang! was also a television series on IFC hosted by Scott Aukerman and featuring in different seasons bandleaders "Weird Al" Yankovic, Reggie Watts and Kid Cudi.

History
Comedy Death-Ray Radio first aired May 1, 2009, after Aukerman gained permission from Indie 103 to conduct a "one-month tryout". The first episode's guests were Rob Huebel and Thomas Lennon. During occasions when Aukerman has been unable to host, Paul F. Tompkins, Chris Hardwick, Jimmy Pardo or Jerry Minor (in character as "Cyberthug") have guest hosted. Although normally produced in Los Angeles, the show has also been taped in Vancouver, Seattle, New York City, Chicago and Austin.

Name change
On the May 15, 2011 "Two-year Anniversary" podcast, Aukerman announced that the show's name was changing to Comedy Bang Bang: The Podcast. He went on to say that the show had evolved a great deal in its first two years, and he credited his wife Kulap Vilaysack with coming up with the new name.

Red Hot Chili Peppers parody
In episode 204 (which aired on March 4, 2013), "The Pepper Men," guests Jon Daly and Zach Galifianakis professed their love for the rock band Red Hot Chili Peppers. Both claimed to be "huge Pepper Men" and had written a song in tribute to the band titled "Abracadabralifornia", which Daly sang using his best Anthony Kiedis imitation.

On January 29, 2014, a very official-looking website called www.RHCP2014.com appeared online claiming to have the brand-new Chili Peppers song, "Abracadabralifornia". The song even featured a layout for the band's upcoming Super Bowl appearance, complete with sponsors' logos. Various people through websites including Twitter and Facebook at first were fooled by the song, although many quickly realized that it was a parody. The song was written and performed by Daly and musician Cyrus Ghahremani. Chili Peppers drummer Chad Smith Tweeted his approval of the song.

Format and features
The podcast begins with a theme song composed and performed by Reggie Watts, followed by the reading of a listener-submitted catchphrase, under the pretense that one will eventually replace the show's original catchphrase, "What's up, hot dog?"

The show's format mixes conversation between the host and guests with comedy songs and occasionally game segments. Some guests play characters or impersonate certain celebrities, sometimes for the entirety of the episode.

For the first few months of the program, comedian Doug Benson would semi-regularly call the program and give several "8 Words or Less Movie Reviews".

Occasionally the podcast is taped with a live audience, usually at comedy shows or at festival events.

In the last third of the show, Aukerman and his guests will often play one of several improv-style games. Examples of games played include:
"Would You Rather?", in which the guests are presented with two typically absurd scenarios; following a brief question-and-answer session with answers made up on the spot by Aukerman, the contestants are asked to choose one of the options, with points given after each round.
 "Riddle Me This", in which one person comes up with a question that is the setup for a joke. An example would be "What's brown and is often spotted near a fast-food restaurant?". The other contestants then come up with answers and vote whose answer was the funniest.
"Freestyle Rap Battle/Contest", in which the guests take turns performing a freestyle rap.
"What Am I Thinking?", in which two guests (or Scott) count down together from three and attempt to use word association to say the same word.

The following games have been played on the podcast in the past, but not recently:
"Jukebox Jury", in which Scott and the guests rate songs sent in by listeners as either "mustard" or "pants", although the meanings of the ratings is unknown.
"Alive or Dead", in which Scott gives the guests the name of a celebrity and they must determine if that celebrity is alive or dead. The people in question are usually alive but their fictional deaths are described in a humorous way.
"Who Said It?", in which guests name the person to whom a given quote is attributed.
"Hollywood Facts", in which Scott and guests list fake celebrity gossip news. This game has largely been discontinued, however the game's theme music is regularly played when guest Andy Samberg appears on the podcast because Samberg recorded it.

Occasionally, guests will present their own features on the show. Examples include:
"Harris' Foam/Phone Corner", in which Harris Wittels recited jokes, text-messaged to himself, which were deemed unworthy of his stand-up performances, and was ridiculed for his efforts.
"New No-Nos", in which Paul Rust makes up new rules for life and the world; which he refers to as New No-Nos. Nearly every new rule is a ridiculous idea that can already be accomplished without consequence.
"The Solo Bolo Olympic Song Challenge", in which Ben Schwartz and Scott sing a myriad of different songs, jingles, and show-tunes, with minimal regard to pitch and rhythm. They ostensibly  attempt to seamlessly transition between songs that have some sort of connection to one another. These connections can include being by the same artist, including the same word, or in many cases, having absolutely no relation.

Episodes

Recurring guests

Paul F. Tompkins (212 episodes)
Lauren Lapkus (57 episodes)
Jason Mantzoukas (56 episodes)
James Adomian (54 episodes)
Andy Daly (46 episodes)
Neil Campbell (45 episodes)
Jon Gabrus (43 episodes)
Will Hines (43 episodes)
Nick Kroll (41 episodes)
Ben Schwartz (35 episodes)
Carl Tart (35 episodes)
Drew Tarver (34 episodes)
Shaun Diston (32 episodes)
Mike Hanford (32 episodes)
Tim Baltz (30 episodes)
Jon Daly (30 episodes)
Horatio Sanz (30 episodes)
Lily Sullivan (29 episodes)
Paul Rust (28 episodes)
Seth Morris (27 episodes)
Matt Besser (26 episodes)
Ryan Gaul (26 episodes)
Mary Holland (26 episodes)
Ego Nwodim (26 episodes)
Dan Lippert (25 episodes)
Jessica McKenna (24 episodes)
Doug Benson (21 episodes)
Jessica St. Clair (21 episodes)
Brett Gelman (20 episodes)
Harris Wittels (20 episodes)
Tawny Newsome (19 episodes)
Reggie Watts (19 episodes)
"Weird Al" Yankovic (19 episodes)
Thomas Middleditch (17 episodes)
Zeke Nicholson (17 episodes)
Paul Scheer (17 episodes)
Brendon Small (17 episodes)
Joe Wengert (17 episodes)
Matt Gourley (16 episodes)
Lennon Parham (15 episodes)
John Gemberling (14 episodes)
Bob Odenkirk (14 episodes)
Patton Oswalt (14 episodes)
Jimmy Pardo (14 episodes)
Matt Apodaca (13 episodes)
Rob Huebel (13 episodes)
Gillian Jacobs (13 episodes)
Andy Richter (13 episodes)
Paul Brittain (12 episodes)
Zach Galifianakis (12 episodes)
Thomas Lennon (12 episodes)
Chelsea Peretti (12 episodes)
Ben Rodgers (12 episodes)
Ryan Rosenberg (12 episodes)
Adam Scott (12 episodes)
Nick Thune (12 episodes)
Madeline Walter (12 episodes)
Bobby Moynihan (11 episodes)
Tig Notaro (11 episodes)
Andy Samberg (11 episodes)
David Wain (11 episodes)
Todd Glass (10 episodes)
Jon Hamm (10 episodes)
Tim Heidecker (10 episodes)
Gil Ozeri (10 episodes)
Jeremy Rowley (10 episodes)
Sarah Silverman (10 episodes)
Betsy Sodaro (10 episodes)
Matt Walsh (10 episodes)
Nick Wiger (10 episodes)
Kristian Bruun (9 episodes)
Brian Huskey (9 episodes)
Tim Kalpakis (9 episodes)
Natasha Leggero (9 episodes)
Kumail Nanjiani (9 episodes)
Claudia O'Doherty (9 episodes)
Zac Oyama (9 episodes)
Edi Patterson (9 episodes)
Erin Whitehead (9 episodes)
Casey Wilson (9 episodes)
David Cross (8 episodes)
Taran Killam (8 episodes)
Adam Pally (8 episodes)
Zach Reino (8 episodes)
Mookie Blaiklock (7 episodes)
D'Arcy Carden (7 episodes)
Eugene Cordero (7 episodes)
Cameron Esposito (7 episodes)
Lisa Gilroy (7 episodes)
Howard Kremer (7 episodes)
Jerry Minor (7 episodes)
Pamela Murphy (7 episodes)
Holly Prazoff (7 episodes)
Martin Starr (7 episodes)
Kulap Vilaysack (7 episodes)
Michael Cassady (6 episodes)
Jefferson Dutton (6 episodes)
John Hodgman (6 episodes)
Riki Lindhome (6 episodes)
Tatiana Maslany (6 episodes)
Allan McLeod (6 episodes)
Vic Michaelis (6 episodes)
John Mulaney (6 episodes)
Kevin Nealon (6 episodes)
Griffin Newman (6 episodes)
Jonah Ray (6 episodes)
Alison Rich (6 episodes)
Rory Scovel (6 episodes)
Caroline Anderson (5 episodes)
Matt Braunger (5 episodes)
River Butcher (5 episodes)
Sean Clements (5 episodes)
Rob Corddry (5 episodes)
Colin Hanks (5 episodes)
Mike Mitchell (5 episodes)
Jacquis Neal (5 episodes)
Natalie Palamides (5 episodes)
Max Silvestri (5 episodes)
The Sklar Brothers (5 episodes)
Mary Sohn (5 episodes)
Dave Theune (5 episodes)
Brendon Walsh (5 episodes)
Edgar Wright (5 episodes)
Jacob Wysocki (5 episodes)
Ronnie Adrian (4 episodes)
Dan Ahdoot (4 episodes)
Stephanie Allynne (4 episodes)
Maria Bamford (4 episodes)
Ike Barinholtz (4 episodes)
Suzi Barrett (4 episodes)
Todd Barry (4 episodes)
Michael Ian Black (4 episodes)
Jerrod Carmichael (4 episodes)
Adam Cayton-Holland (4 episodes)
Hayes Davenport (4 episodes)
Jocelyn DeBoer (4 episodes)
Sean Dickerson (4 episodes)
Casey Feigh (4 episodes)
Dave Ferguson (4 episodes)
Nathan Fielder (4 episodes)
Fran Gillespie (4 episodes)
Chris Hardwick (4 episodes)
Erinn Hayes (4 episodes)
Langston Kerman (4 episodes)
Jon Mackey (4 episodes)
Dan Mangan (4 episodes)
Aimee Mann (4 episodes)
Ken Marino (4 episodes)
Edgar Momplaisir (4 episodes)
Mike O'Brien (4 episodes)
Eddie Pepitone (4 episodes)
Amy Phillips (4 episodes)
Mary Lynn Rajskub (4 episodes)
Katie Rich (4 episodes)
Andrea Savage (4 episodes)
Danielle Schneider (4 episodes)
Dhruv Uday Singh (4 episodes)
Monika Smith (4 episodes)
Nick Swardson (4 episodes)
Ele Woods (4 episodes)
Aziz Ansari (3 episodes)
Anthony Atamanuik (3 episodes)
Kate Berlant (3 episodes)
Mike Birbiglia (3 episodes)
The Birthday Boys (3 episodes)
Kyle Bornheimer (3 episodes)
Jordan Black (3 episodes)
Flula Borg (3 episodes)
Molly Bretthauer (3 episodes)
Nick Ciarelli (3 episodes)
Jackie Clarke (3 episodes)
Adam DeVine (3 episodes)
Brad Evans (3 episodes)
Devin Field (3 episodes)
Anthony Jeselnik (3 episodes)
Alana Johnston (3 episodes)
Moshe Kasher (3 episodes)
Kyle Kinane (3 episodes)
Ted Leo (3 episodes)
James Mannion (3 episodes)
Mandell Maughan (3 episodes)
Kate Micucci (3 episodes)
Eugene Mirman (3 episodes)
Haley Joel Osment (3 episodes)
Nicole Parker (3 episodes)
Amy Poehler (3 episodes)
Jack Quaid (3 episodes)
June Diane Raphael (3 episodes)
Eliza Skinner (3 episodes)
Jenny Slate (3 episodes)
Chris Tallman (3 episodes)
Gregg Turkington (3 episodes)
Brent Weinbach (3 episodes)
Lamar Woods (3 episodes)

2009

2010

2011

2012

2013

2014

2015

2016

2017

2018

2019

2020

2021

2022

2023

Reception

"Often strange, consistently hilarious, always unpredictable." – Entertainment Weekly

"One of the 10 Best Comedy Podcasts Of The Moment...never strays far from a laugh." – Rolling Stone

GQ has praised the show, calling it in 2010 "one of the preeminent places to hear not only the stalwarts of stand-up... but also lesser known comics, like Natasha Leggero, Chelsea Peretti, and Brett Gelman."

The A.V. Club says "The guests are routinely top-notch, the show has a de facto company of ace improvisers enlivening each episode, and Scott Aukerman is a gleefully indulgent host", also saying "For comedy fans, Comedy Bang Bang is essential listening." It frequently appears in the Podmass column, highlighting the best podcasts of each week, and the website named Comedy Bang! Bang! the best podcast of 2013.

"It's perhaps the easiest show to single out as a juggernaut; the podcast is ten years in with over 600 episodes, a testament to creator Scott Aukerman's unparalleled collaboration prowess." — Vulture

The show won in the Comedy category at the 2015 and 2017 Academy of Podcasters Awards.

See also
Comedy Death-Ray

Footnotes

 The "Closing Up the Plugbag" closing theme (the Ken Marino, Steve Agee & Casey Wilson version used from 2012 to 2015) featured a growing number of ending tags by Adam Pally, Brendon Small and Paul F. Tompkins.
 Since 2016, Ben Schwartz and sometimes Horatio Sanz have recording a new "Closing Up the Plugbag" theme during the first episode each year. That theme (or a remix created by a listener) is then used for the rest of the year. It has occasionally included audio contributions from Jason Mantzoukas, expressing his disdain for the closing theme as it occurs.

References

External links

Comedy and humor podcasts
Audio podcasts
Earwolf
2009 podcast debuts
Podcasts adapted into television shows
American podcasts